A swineherd  is a person who raises and herds pigs as livestock.

Swineherds in literature
 In the New Testament are mentioned shepherd of pigs, mentioned in the Pig (Gadarene) the story shows Jesus exorcising a demon or demons from a man and a flock of pigs, as well as in the parable of the Prodigal Son in a son who wastes his father's fortune and is forced to work as a Swineherd.
 Hans Christian Andersen wrote a fairy tale called The Swineherd.
 In Greek mythology, Eumaeus (or Eumaios) was Odysseus' swineherd.
 In the Parable the Prodigal Son, the younger son wastes his inheritance and eventually has to become a swineherd.
 In Lloyd Alexander's books The Chronicles of Prydain, based on Welsh mythology, the hero is a pig keeper, or swineherd.
 The character Gurth, in Sir Walter Scott's novel Ivanhoe is a swineherd.
 The main character in the Disney film The Black Cauldron is a swineherd.
 Among Eiléan Ní Chuilleanáin's most famous work is the poem "Swineherd".
 The protagonist in H. P. Lovecraft's story “The Rats in the Walls“ has reoccurring nightmares of a bearded daemon swineherd.
 Mentioned as a class of labourer in the Statute of Labourers 1351.
 In the Senchas Fagbála Caisil "The Story of the Finding of Cashel", one of the earliest medieval Irish texts, the legend of the kingship of Cashel is told through several visions experienced by two swineherds, Duirdriu and Cuirirán.

Swineherds in paintings

 The Swineherd, a 1888 painting by French artist Paul Gauguin

Swineherds in history
 Denewulf, Bishop of Winchester from 878 or 879 until his death in 908, began his life as a swineherd.
 Ivaylo of Bulgaria, a swineherd who spearheaded a peasant uprising and became tsar of Bulgaria (1277–1278).
 Rafael Carrera, President of Guatemala 1844-48 and 1851-65

See also

 Pig farming
 Porcarius, Latin for swineherd, sometimes used as a name

References

 Swineherd, Askoxford.com
 Swineherd, Bartleby.com

Animal husbandry occupations
Pig farming